Chenopodium ficifolium, the fig-leaved goosefoot or figleaf goosefoot, is a plant species in the family Amaranthaceae originally native to the Irano-Turanian floristic region. It an archaeophyte weed in Europe and can now be found in temperate crop-growing regions in most of the world.

References

ficifolium
Flora of Malta